The 1977 Montreal Alouettes finished the season in 1st place in the Eastern Conference with an 11–5 record and won the Grey Cup. The Alouettes set CFL attendance records for the most attended regular season game with 69,093 fans attending the September 6 match-up with the Toronto Argonauts and for the most attended Grey Cup game with 68,205 people attending the 65th Grey Cup. Both records still stand today.

Offseason

Preseason

Regular season

Standings

Schedule

Postseason

Grey Cup

Awards and honours

References

External links
Official Site

Montreal Alouettes seasons
Grey Cup championship seasons
James S. Dixon Trophy championship seasons
1977 Canadian Football League season by team
1970s in Montreal
1977 in Quebec